Paul Parkinson OAM of Brisbane, Australia served as the Regional Chair of the Asia-Pacific Regional Scout Committee of the World Organization of the Scout Movement (WOSM), Scouts Australia National Commissioner for Adult Training and Development. He is, as well, Principal of the Scouts Australia Institute of Training (SAIT).

Parkinson started Scouting as a Cub, gaining his Queen's Scout Award in 1968, and the Baden-Powell Award in 1976. He became  Deputy Chief Commissioner, Queensland Branch. He was awarded the Silver Kangaroo by Scouts Australia in 2004, and in 2009 (from the Scout Association of Malaysia) the Pingat Perkhidmatan Cemerlang.

Parkinson earned a Master of Environmental Education degree, and is  completing Doctoral studies associated with self-regulatory learning practices in adults. He is a Lecturer (academia) in Science Education at the Mount Gravatt Campus of Griffith University, in Brisbane. He has had national involvement in the development of science curriculum, and of science education.

See also

References

External links
https://scout.org/node/94/about/138
https://www.scout.org/node/141321
https://issuu.com/worldscouting/docs/6th_issue_january_2013
https://issuu.com/worldscouting/docs/09_4rd_issue_2013
www.europak-online.net/wp-content/uploads/2014/02/Joint-14-EGSC-report-En.pdf
http://euroscoutinfo.com/tag/paul-parkinson/
https://scoutsqld.com.au/.../J1179-Scouts-Annual-Report-PRINT-READY-PROOF.pdf

World Scout Committee members
Year of birth missing
Scouting and Guiding in Australia